Baeckea diosmifolia, commonly known as fringed baeckea, is a species of flowering plant in the family Myrtaceae and is endemic to eastern Australia. It is a shrub with lance-shaped leaves with the narrower end towards the base, and white flowers with seven to nine stamens.

Description

Taxonomy
Baeckea diosmifolia was first formally described in 1807 by Edward Rudge in Transactions of the Linnean Society of London. The specific epithet (diosmifolia) means "Diosma-leaved".

Distribution and habitat
This baeckea grows in wet heathland along the coast and nearby tablelands of New South Wales as far south as the Budawang Range and as far inland as the Goulburn River. It is only known from a single population near Crows Nest in Queensland, although there are old records from Brisbane suburbs.

References

Flora of New South Wales
Flora of Queensland
brevifolia
Plants described in 1807
Taxa named by Edward Rudge